Rabbit or The Rabbit is a nickname given to:

 Wayne Bartholomew (born 1954), Australian surfer
 Wes Bradshaw (1897–1960), American football player and coach
 Rabbit Brown (c. 1880–c. 1937), American blues guitarist and composer
 John Bundrick (born 1948), American rock musician
 Raymond Burnett (1914–1996), American football player and coach
 Johnny Hodges (1906–1970), American jazz saxophonist
 Miller Huggins (1879–1929), American Major League Baseball player and manager
 Otis Lawry (1893–1965), American Major League Baseball player
 Rabbit Maranville (1891–1954), American Major League Baseball player
 Edna Murray (1898–1966), American criminal
 Eric Parsons (1923–2011), English footballer
 Jimmy Slagle (1873–1956), American Major League Baseball player
 Ryland Steen, drummer known as "The Rabbit"
 Jackie Tavener (1897–1969), American Major League Baseball player
 Rabbit Warstler (1903–1964), American Major League Baseball player
 Rabbit Whitman (1897–1969), American minor league baseball player

See also 
 Ray Warren (born 1943), Australian sports commentator nicknamed "Rabbits"
 Walter Ball (baseball) (1877–1946), American Negro league baseball pitcher nicknamed "The Georgia Rabbit"
 Juancho Rois (born 1958), Colombian musician and composer nicknamed El Conejo ("the rabbit")
 Alberto Tarantini (born 1955), Argentine footballer nicknamed conejo
 Bunny (nickname)

Lists of people by nickname